Canfield is a city in central Mahoning County, Ohio, United States. The population was 7,699 as of the 2020 census. In 2005, Canfield was rated the 82nd best place to live in the United States by Money magazine.

History

Canfield Township was established in 1798 as township number 1 in range 3 by purchase from the Connecticut Land Company in the Connecticut Western Reserve. It was purchased by six men, although the majority was owned by Judson Canfield, a land agent. The township took his name in 1800. Canfield's first settlers arrived shortly after surveying was initiated in 1798, primarily from Connecticut, although waves of German immigrants around 1805 and Irish around 1852 would occur. Goods were transported initially by horse and wagon about 55 miles (91 km) from Pittsburgh; later, the Beaver Canal served as the primary method for commerce. By 1805, Canfield had approximately 17 homes, a store and a school; it became a trade center for the region.

Canfield was part of Trumbull County until 1846, when the counties in the area were redefined and Mahoning County emerged as a new county. Canfield was made the county seat in 1846, an incorporated in 1849, igniting a three decade long feud with the larger Youngstown on which should be the seat. The Ohio State Legislature voted to move the seat to Youngstown in 1874. After the removal of the seat of government, Canfield became the center of the farming community in central Mahoning County. It is home to many examples of classic revival architecture, such as the mid-19th century Charles Ruggles House and Judge Eben Newton House on the National Register of Historic Places.

Geography

It is surrounded by Canfield Township.

Demographics

2010 census
As of the census of 2010, there were 7,515 people, 3,073 households, and 2,196 families residing in the city. The racial makeup of the city was 96.4% White, 0.4% African American, 0.1% Native American, 1.8% Asian, 0.5% from other races, and 0.7% from two or more races. Hispanic or Latino of any race were 1.5% of the population.

There were 3,073 households, of which 30.8% had children under the age of 18 living with them, 59.7% were married couples living together, 8.7% had a female householder with no husband present, 3.0% had a male householder with no wife present, and 28.5% were non-families. 26.8% of all households were made up of individuals, and 13.6% had someone living alone who was 65 years of age or older. The average household size was 2.44 and the average family size was 2.96.

The median age in the city was 45.8 years. 23.6% of residents were under the age of 18; 5.8% were between the ages of 18 and 24; 19.4% were from 25 to 44; 32.1% were from 45 to 64; and 19% were 65 years of age or older. The gender makeup of the city was 48.0% male and 52.0% female.

2000 census
As of the census of 2000, there were 7,374 people, 2,917 households, and 2,143 families residing in the city. The population density was 1,588.1 people per square mile (613.6/km2). There were 3,043 housing units at an average density of 655.4 per square mile (253.2/km2). The racial makeup of the city was 97.27% White, 1.29% Asian, 0.45% African American, 0.04% Native American, 0.04% Pacific Islander, 0.33% from other races, and 0.58% from two or more races. Hispanic or Latino of any race were 0.84% of the population.

There were 2,917 households, out of which 33.3% had children under the age of 18 living with them, 65.0% were married couples living together, 6.9% had a female householder with no husband present, and 26.5% were non-families. 24.7% of all households were made up of individuals, and 12.1% had someone living alone who was 65 years of age or older. The average household size was 2.53 and the average family size was 3.03.

In the city the population was spread out, with 25.6% under the age of 18, 5.2% from 18 to 24, 24.1% from 25 to 44, 27.7% from 45 to 64, and 17.4% who were 65 years of age or older. The median age was 42.3 years. For every 100 females, there were 90.6 males. For every 100 females age 18 and over, there were 86.7 males.

The median income for a household in the city was $59,434 and the median income for a family was $71,484. Males had a median income of $35,346 versus $20,493 for females. The per capita income for the city is $31,756. About 2.1% of the families and 3.2% of the population live below the poverty line. Including 3.0% of those under age 18 and 4.3% of those 65 years of age or older.

Arts and culture

Canfield is best known as the site of the Canfield Fairgrounds, which host one of the largest fairs in Ohio, the Canfield Fair. The fair has an average attendance of 350,000 over Labor Day weekend. Beginning with The Lennon Sisters kicking off the entertainment in 1956, many top music acts have made their way to the since 1968, including Bob Hope, Dolly Parton, Rascal Flatts, The Beach Boys, The Monkees, "Weird Al" Yankovic, Brad Paisley, The Goo Goo Dolls, The Band Perry, and Pentatonix. Canfield is also home to the War Vet Museum, located in the city's the oldest structure on its original site and home to artifacts from each American war, as well as Loghurst, a farm museum housed in the oldest remaining log cabin in the Connecticut Western Reserve.

Government
Canfield operates under a chartered council–manager government, where there are four council members elected as a legislature for 4-year terms in addition to a mayor, who serves as an executive. The council employs a city manager for administration. The current mayor is Don Dragish.

In the Ohio General Assembly, Canfield is located in the 33rd Senate District, represented by Michael Rulli (R), and in the 59th State Representative District, represented by Alessandro Cutrona (R). Federally, Canfield is located in Ohio's 6th congressional district, which has a Cook PVI of R+16 and has been represented by Bill Johnson (R) since 2011. Its federal senators are Sherrod Brown (D) and Rob Portman (R).

Education

Children in Canfield are served by the Canfield Local School District. The current schools serving Canfield include:
 Hilltop Elementary School – grades K-4, built in 1972
 C.H. Campbell Elementary School – grades K-4 built in 1960
 Canfield Village Middle School – grades 5–8, built in 1903
 Canfield High School – grades 9-12, built in 1984

A branch of the Public Library of Youngstown and Mahoning County is located in Canfield.

Notable people
Frederick William Chapman, minister and genealogist
Alessandro Cutrona, member of the Ohio House of Representatives from the 59th district
Bob Dove, National Football League player and coach
JD Eicher, singer-songwriter
Columbia Lancaster, first delegate to the U.S. House of Representatives from the Territory of Washington
Eben Newton, U.S. Representative from Ohio's 19th District
Ryan Sachire, professional tennis player and tennis coach for the University of Notre Dame
Craig Snyder, professional boxer
A. William Sweeney, Ohio Supreme Court justice
Myron E. Ullman, former CEO of J.C. Penney and Chairman of Starbucks Corporation
Elijah Wadsworth, American Revolutionary War captain and major general in the War of 1812
Frederick Wadsworth, Ohio militia officer, businessman, and Mayor of Akron
Elisha Whittlesey, U.S. Representative from Ohio's 13th District
William A. Whittlesey, U.S. Representative from Ohio's 13th District
Denise DeBartolo York, billionaire businesswoman of The DeBartolo Corporation and owner of the San Francisco 49ers

References

External links
 City website

Cities in Mahoning County, Ohio
Populated places established in 1798
1798 establishments in the Northwest Territory
Cities in Ohio